Berthelinia schlumbergeri is a species of a sea snail with a shell comprising two separate hinged pieces or valves. It is a marine gastropod mollusk in the family Juliidae.

Distribution
This subtropical species occurs in the western Indian Ocean, particularly South Africa. The type locality for this species is Madagascar.

References

Juliidae
Gastropods described in 1895